Mohinder Kumar (born 11 June 1959) is a Pakistani cricketer. He played sixty-five first-class and fifty-three list A matches for Karachi and House Building Finance Corporation between 1976 and 1993.

References

External links
 

Living people
1959 births
Pakistani cricketers
Karachi cricketers
Cricketers from Karachi
House Building Finance Corporation cricketers
Pakistani Hindus